There are three peaks in Pakistan named Laila Peak.

 Laila Peak (Hushe Valley) (6096 or 6614m) in Hushe Valley, Karakoram,
 Laila Peak (Haramosh Valley) (6985m) in Haramosh Valley, Karakoram (near Chogurunma Glacier),
 Laila Peak (Rupal Valley) (5971m) in Rupal Valley, Himalaya.
Other peak:
 Laila Peak (Caucasus) (approx. 4000m) in Svaneti, Georgia.

See also
 List of Mountains in Pakistan
 Gilgit-Baltistan
 Highest Mountains of the World